The men's 4 × 200 metre freestyle relay event at the 2010 Asian Games took place on 15 November 2010 at Guangzhou Aoti Aquatics Centre.

There were 12 teams who took part in this event. Two heats were held. The heat in which a team competed did not formally matter for advancement, as the teams with the top eight times from the both field qualified for the finals.

China won the gold medal with 7 minutes 07.68 seconds. Before this Asian games, Japan got all 15 gold medals of men's 4 x 200 metre freestyle relay. It was the first time that Japan didn't win this event in Asian games.

Schedule
All times are China Standard Time (UTC+08:00)

Records

Results 
Legend
DNS — Did not start
DSQ — Disqualified

Heats

Final

References
 16th Asian Games Results

External links 
 Men's 4 × 200m Freestyle Relay Heats Official Website
 Men's 4 × 200m Freestyle Relay Ev.No.19 Final Official Website

Swimming at the 2010 Asian Games